Opopaea is a genus of goblin spiders of the family Oonopidae. The genus is one of the largest within the family, with 180 accepted species.

Description
Spiders of the genus are very small, less than 2 mm long. They are usually a reddish-brown color. They have six eyes: four posterior in a straight row, and two anterior.

Species

 Opopaea aculeata Baehr & Harvey, 2013 — Western Australia
 Opopaea acuminata Baehr, 2013 — New South Wales
 Opopaea addsae Baehr & Harvey, 2013 — New South Wales
 Opopaea alje Saaristo & Marusik, 2008 — Tanzania
 Opopaea ameyi Baehr, 2013 — Queensland
 Opopaea amieu Baehr, 2013 — New Caledonia
 Opopaea andranomay Andriamalala & Hormiga, 2013 — Madagascar
 Opopaea andringitra Andriamalala & Hormiga, 2013 — Madagascar
 Opopaea ankarafantsika Andriamalala & Hormiga, 2013 — Madagascar
 Opopaea ankarana Andriamalala & Hormiga, 2013 — Madagascar
 Opopaea antoniae Baehr, 2013 — Queensland, New South Wales
 Opopaea antsalova Andriamalala & Hormiga, 2013 — Madagascar
 Opopaea antsiranana Andriamalala & Hormiga, 2013 — Madagascar
 Opopaea apicalis (Simon, 1893) — Pantropical
 Opopaea aurantiaca Baehr & Harvey, 2013 — Western Australia
 Opopaea auriforma Tong & Li, 2013 — China
 Opopaea banksi (Hickman, 1950) — Australia
 Opopaea batanguena Barrion & Litsinger, 1995 — Philippines
 Opopaea bemaraha Andriamalala & Hormiga, 2013 — Madagascar
 Opopaea bemarivo Andriamalala & Hormiga, 2013 — Madagascar
 Opopaea berenty Andriamalala & Hormiga, 2013 — Madagascar
 Opopaea berlandi (Simon & Fage, 1922) — East Africa
 Opopaea betioky Andriamalala & Hormiga, 2013 — Madagascar
 Opopaea bicolor Baehr, 2013 — New Caledonia
 Opopaea billroth Baehr & Harvey, 2013 — Western Australia
 Opopaea botswana Saaristo & Marusik, 2008 — Botswana
 Opopaea brisbanensis Baehr, 2013 — Queensland
 Opopaea broadwater Baehr, 2013 — Queensland, Australia
 Opopaea burwelli Baehr, 2013 — New Caledonia
 Opopaea bushblitz Baehr, 2013 — New South Wales
 Opopaea calcaris Baehr, 2013 — New Caledonia
 Opopaea callani Baehr & Harvey, 2013 — Western Australia
 Opopaea calona Chickering, 1969 — USA
 Opopaea carnarvon Baehr, 2013 — Queensland
 Opopaea carteri Baehr, 2013 — Queensland
 Opopaea chrisconwayi Baehr & Harvey, 2013 — Queensland
 Opopaea concolor (Blackwall, 1859) — Pantropical
 Opopaea conujaingensis (Xu, 1986) — China
 Opopaea cornuta Yin & Wang, 1984 — China
 Opopaea cowra Baehr & Harvey, 2013 — Western Australia
 Opopaea deserticola Simon, 1891 — Pantropical
 Opopaea diaolaushan Tong & Li, 2010 — China
 Opopaea douglasi Baehr, 2013 — Queensland
 Opopaea durranti Baehr & Harvey, 2013 — Western Australia
 Opopaea ectognophus Harvey & Edward, 2007 — Western Australia
 Opopaea ephemera Baehr, 2013 — Northern Territory
 Opopaea euphorbicola Strand, 1909 — Ascension Islands
 Opopaea exoculata Baehr & Harvey, 2013 — Western Australia
 Opopaea fiji Baehr, 2013 — Fiji
 Opopaea fishriver Baehr, 2013 — Northern Territory
 Opopaea flabellata Tong & Li, 2013 — China
 Opopaea flava Baehr & Harvey, 2013 — Western Australia
 Opopaea floridana (Banks, 1896) — USA
 Opopaea foulpointe Andriamalala & Hormiga, 2013 — Madagascar
 Opopaea foveolata Roewer, 1963 — Pacific
 Opopaea fragilis Baehr & Harvey, 2013 — Western Australia
 Opopaea framenaui Baehr & Harvey, 2013 — Western Australia
 Opopaea furcula Baehr & Harvey, 2013 — China
 Opopaea gabon Saaristo & Marusik, 2008 — Gabon
 Opopaea gaborone Saaristo & Marusik, 2008 — Botswana
 Opopaea gerstmeieri Baehr, 2013 — New South Wales
 Opopaea gibbifera Tong & Li, 2008 — China
 Opopaea gilliesi Baehr, 2013 — Northern Territory
 Opopaea goloboffi Baehr, 2013 — New Caledonia
 Opopaea gracilis Baehr & Harvey, 2013 — Western Australia
 Opopaea gracillima Baehr & Harvey, 2013 — Western Australia
 Opopaea harmsi Baehr & Harvey, 2013 — Western Australia
 Opopaea hawaii Baehr, 2013 — Hawaii
 Opopaea hoplites (Berland, 1914) — East Africa
 Opopaea ita Ott, 2003 — Brazil
 Opopaea itampolo riamalala & Hormiga, 2013 — Madagascar
 Opopaea johannae Baehr & Harvey, 2013 — Western Australia
 Opopaea johardingae Baehr, 2013 — Northern Territory
 Opopaea jonesae Baehr, 2013 — Queensland
 Opopaea julianneae Baehr & Ott, 2013 — Western Australia
 Opopaea kirindy Andriamalala & Hormiga, 2013 — Madagascar
 Opopaea kulczynskii (Berland, 1914) — East Africa
 Opopaea lambkinae Baehr, 2013 — Queensland
 Opopaea lebretoni Baehr, 2013 — New South Wales
 Opopaea leica Baehr, 2013 — Queensland
 Opopaea leichhardti Baehr, 2013 — Queensland
 Opopaea lemniscata Tong & Li, 2013 — Laos
 Opopaea linea Baehr, 2013 — Queensland, New South Wales
 Opopaea lingua Saaristo, 2007 — Israel
 Opopaea macula Tong & Li, 2013 — China
 Opopaea magna Baehr, 2013 — New South Wales
 Opopaea mahafaly Andriamalala & Hormiga, 2013 — Madagascar
 Opopaea manderano Andriamalala & Hormiga, 2013 — Madagascar
 Opopaea manongarivo Andriamalala & Hormiga, 2013 — Madagascar
 Opopaea marangaroo Baehr & Harvey, 2013 — Western Australia
 Opopaea margaretehoffmannae Baehr & Smith, 2013 — New South Wales
 Opopaea margaritae (Denis, 1947) — Egypt
 Opopaea maroantsetra Andriamalala & Hormiga, 2013 — Comoro Islands
 Opopaea martini Baehr, 2013 — New South Wales
 Opopaea mattica Simon, 1893 — Gabon, South Africa
 Opopaea mcleani Baehr, 2013 — Queensland
 Opopaea media Song & Xu, 1984 — China
 Opopaea meditata Gertsch & Davis, 1936 — USA
 Opopaea michaeli Baehr & Smith, 2013 — New South Wales
 Opopaea millbrook Baehr, 2013 — South Australia
 Opopaea milledgei Baehr, 2013 — New South Wales
 Opopaea millstream Baehr & Harvey, 2013 — Western Australia
 Opopaea mollis (Simon, 1907) — Sri Lanka
 Opopaea monteithi Baehr, 2013 — New Caledonia
 Opopaea mundy Baehr, 2013 — South Australia
 Opopaea nadineae Baehr & Harvey, 2013 — Western Australia
 Opopaea namoroka Andriamalala & Hormiga, 2013 — Madagascar
 Opopaea ndoua Baehr, 2013 — New Caledonia
 Opopaea nibasa Saaristo & van Harten, 2006 — Yemen
 Opopaea nitens Baehr, 2013 — New South Wales
 Opopaea olivernashi Baehr, 2011 — Queensland
 Opopaea ottoi Baehr, 2013 — New South Wales
 Opopaea palau Baehr, 2013 — Palau
 Opopaea pallida Baehr & Harvey, 2013 — Western Australia
 Opopaea pannawonica Baehr & Ott, 2013 — Western Australia
 Opopaea phineus Harvey & Edward, 2007 — Western Australia
 Opopaea pilbara Baehr & Ott, 2013 — Western Australia
 Opopaea plana Baehr, 2013 — New South Wales
 Opopaea platnicki Baehr, 2013 — New Caledonia
 Opopaea plumula Yin & Wang, 1984 — China
 Opopaea preecei Baehr, 2013 — Northern Territory
 Opopaea probosciella Saaristo, 2001 — Seychelles
 Opopaea proserpine Baehr, 2013 — Queensland
 Opopaea punctata (O. P.-Cambridge, 1872) — Lebanon, Israel, other records doubtful
 Opopaea raveni Baehr, 2013 — New Caledonia
 Opopaea rigidula Tong & Li, 2013 — China
 Opopaea rixi Baehr & Harvey, 2013 — Western Australia
 Opopaea robusta Baehr & Harvey, 2013 — Western Australia
 Opopaea rogerkitchingi Baehr, 2011 — Queensland
 Opopaea rugosa Baehr & Ott, 2013 — Western Australia
 Opopaea saaristoi Wunderlich, 2011 — Cyprus
 Opopaea sallami Saaristo & van Harten, 2006 — Yemen
 Opopaea sanaa Saaristo & van Harten, 2006 — Yemen
 Opopaea sandranantitra Andriamalala & Hormiga, 2013 — Madagascar
 Opopaea santschii Brignoli, 1974 — Tunisia, Cyprus, Egypt, Israel
 Opopaea sanya Tong & Li, 2010 — China
 Opopaea sauteri Brignoli, 1974 — Taiwan
 Opopaea sedata Gertsch & Mulaik, 1940 — USA
 Opopaea semilunata Tong & Li, 2013 — China
 Opopaea shanasi Saaristo, 2007 — Israel
 Opopaea silhouettei (Benoit, 1979) — Seychelles, Rapa Nui
 Opopaea simoni (Berland, 1914) — East Africa
 Opopaea simplex Baehr, 2013 — New South Wales
 Opopaea sown Baehr, 2013 — Queensland, New South Wales
 Opopaea speciosa (Lawrence, 1952) — South Africa, Yemen
 Opopaea speighti Baehr, 2013 — Queensland
 Opopaea spinosa Saaristo & van Harten, 2006 — Yemen
 Opopaea sponsa Brignoli, 1978 — Bhutan
 Opopaea stanisici Baehr, 2013 — Queensland
 Opopaea stevensi Baehr, 2013 — South Australia
 Opopaea striata Baehr, 2013 — New Caledonia
 Opopaea sturt Baehr, 2013 — New South Wales
 Opopaea subtilis Baehr & Harvey, 2013 — Western Australia
 Opopaea sudan Saaristo & Marusik, 2008 — Sudan
 Opopaea suelewisae Baehr & Smith, 2013 — New South Wales
 Opopaea suspecta Saaristo, 2002 — Seychelles
 Opopaea syarakui (Komatsu, 1967) — Japan
 Opopaea sylvestrella Baehr & Smith, 2013 — New South Wales
 Opopaea tenuis Baehr, 2013 — New South Wales
 Opopaea torotorofotsy Andriamalala & Hormiga, 2013 — Madagascar
 Opopaea touho Baehr, 2013 — New Caledonia
 Opopaea triangularis Baehr & Harvey, 2013 — Western Australia
 Opopaea tsimaloto Andriamalala & Hormiga, 2013 — Madagascar
 Opopaea tsimembo Andriamalala & Hormiga, 2013 — Madagascar
 Opopaea tsingy Andriamalala & Hormiga, 2013 — Madagascar
 Opopaea tsijoriaky Andriamalala & Hormiga, 2013 — Madagascar
 Opopaea tuberculata Baehr, 2013 — New Caledonia
 Opopaea tumida Tong & Li, 2013 — Laos
 Opopaea ulrichi Baehr, 2013 — Queensland
 Opopaea ursulae Baehr, 2013 — New South Wales
 Opopaea viamao Ott, 2003 — Brazil
 Opopaea vitrispina Tong & Li, 2010 — China
 Opopaea vohibazaha Andriamalala & Hormiga, 2013 — Madagascar
 Opopaea wheelarra Baehr & Ott, 2013 — Western Australia
 Opopaea whim Baehr & Harvey, 2013 — Western Australia
 Opopaea wongalara Baehr, 2013 — Northern Territory
 Opopaea yorki Baehr, 2013 — New South Wales
 Opopaea yukii Baehr, 2013 — Queensland
 Opopaea zhengi Tong & Li, 2013 — China

References

Oonopidae
Araneomorphae genera
Cosmopolitan spiders